WWOL (780 AM) is a radio station licensed to Forest City, North Carolina, United States, broadcasting a Southern Gospel format.

As of October 29, 1989, the station is owned by Holly Springs Baptist Broadcasting. WWOL began broadcasting on April 1, 1990, but the frequency was signed on as WBBO ("We Build Business Opportunities") on September 10, 1947, by Rutherford Radio Company. In 1947, the call letters WWOL were first used for a radio station in Lackawanna, New York, which is now WBBF, and on its FM counterpart, which is now WHTT-FM.

External links
 Official website

Southern Gospel radio stations in the United States
Radio stations established in 1947
1947 establishments in North Carolina
WOL
WOL